Catherine Lépront (June 1951, Le Creusot – 19 August 2012) was a French novelist, playwright, short story writer and essayist.

Biography 
Catherine Lépront was born into a family of doctors and musicians. First of all a liberal nurse (an experience which she described in her narrative Des gens du monde), she was a playwright and literary advisor for the Éditions Gallimard. Her novels intertwine intimate and family history and political history. The memory of the Second World War, the Indochina War, the Algerian War, the colonial tragedies and those of the totalitarian world haunts her characters on which she looks with empathy and tender irony. All her work is marked by a profound criticism of bourgeois hypocrisy, arbitrary power and obtuse conformity. She excels at reproducing oral speech, while deepening the subtleties of inner reflections, intrigues with acute psychological tensions, and creating a poetic and lyrical climate that remind of Virginia Woolf and some Russian writers. Music, painting, and artistic creation in general played a decisive role here.

Her second husband was the Germanic philosopher .

Works 
1983: Le Tour du domaine, Paris, Gallimard, 182 p. 
1983: "Charente-Maritime" ou Les Succès d'un enfant du pays, with Maryannick Togni, Paris, Éditions Gallimard, 123 p. 
1984: Une Rumeur , Gallimard, 196 p. 
1986: Le Retour de Julie Farnèse, Gallimard, 230 p. 
1987: Partie de chasse au bord de la mer, Gallimard, 171 p. 
1988: Clara Schumann : la vie à quatre mains, Éditions Robert Laffont, coll. "Elle était une fois", 283 p. 
1989: La Veuve Lucas s'est assise, Gallimard, 179 p. 
1990: Le Passeur de Loire, Gallimard, coll. "L'Un et l'autre", 183 p. 
1991: Trois gardiennes, Gallimard, 166 p. 
 - Prix Goncourt de la nouvelle 1992
1993: Un geste en dentelle, Gallimard, 189 p. 
1995:  Caspar David Friedrich : des paysages les yeux fermés, Gallimard, coll. "L'Art et l'écrivain", 179 p. 
1995: Josée Bethléem, followed by Femme seule à l'aquarium, Gallimard, 184 p. 
1997: Namokel, Éditions du Seuil, 361 p. 
1998: Ivoire, Éditions Gallimard, coll. "", 46 p. 
1998: L'Affaire du muséum, Éditions du Seuil, coll. "Solo", 123 p. 
2000: Le Cahier de moleskine noire du délateur Mikhaïl, Éditions du Seuil, coll. "Solo", 139 p. 
2001: Le café Zimmermann, Éditions du Seuil, 268 p. 
2003: Des gens du monde, Éditions du Seuil, 138 p. 
 - Prix Louis-Guilloux 2004 
2003: Judith et Holopherne, with Marc de Launay and Laura Weigert, coll. "Triptyque", 122 p. 
2005: Transactions infinies, followed by Invitation à la pleine lune, Arles, Actes Sud, coll. "Papiers", 94 p. 
2005: Ces lèvres qui remuent, Éditions du Seuil, 342 p. 
2006: Amparo, Paris, Éditions Inventaire/Invention, coll. "En passant", 57 p. 
2007: Esther Mésopotamie, Éditions du Seuil, 212 p. 
2006: Entre le silence et l'œuvre, Éditions du Seuil, coll. "Réflexion", 343 p. 
2008:  Ingres, ombres permanentes : belles feuilles du Musée Ingres de Montauban, exposition, Montauban, Musée Ingres, 21 March–29 June 2008 and Paris, Musée de la vie romantique, 16 September 2008 – 4 January 2009], catalogue, Paris, Le Passage, coll. "Carte blanche", 157 p. 
2008: Disparition d'un chien, Éditions du Seuil, 375 p. 
2010: Le Beau Visage de l'ennemi, Éditions du Seuil, 232 p. 
2012: L'Anglaise, Éditions du Seuil, 257 p.

References 

1951 births
People from Le Creusot
21st-century French non-fiction writers
French women short story writers
French short story writers
20th-century French essayists
21st-century French essayists
20th-century French dramatists and playwrights
21st-century French dramatists and playwrights
Prix Louis Guilloux winners
Prix Goncourt de la nouvelle recipients
2012 deaths
21st-century French women writers
20th-century French women writers